Sackville was a Montreal-based musical group that played what has been classified as country and pop, although their style resembles more folk, rock and avantgarde. They formed in 1994 and recorded their first album in 1996.

Sackville disbanded in 2001, but many members have gone on to play in other bands, including: Wild Lawns and Black Ox Orkestar (Gabriel Levine), Hangedup (Genevieve Heistek and Eric Craven), Re: and Thee Silver Mt. Zion Memorial Orchestra & Tra-La-La Band (Ian Ilavsky), Triple Burner (Harris Newman - also solo), The Carnations (Pat Conan) and The Red and the Black, Haywood, Cherubino, The Trouble with Sweeney (Rob Viola).

Discography 
Albums
 These Last Songs (1998)
 Natural Life (2001)

EPs
 Low Ebb E.P. (1996)
 The Principles of Science (1999)

Singles
 "My Beautiful Bride" b/w "Destroy, Destroy" (1999) (7" split w/ The Handsome Family)

See also
List of bands from Canada

References

External links 
 Constellation Records' Sackville website
 

Musical groups established in 1994
Musical groups disestablished in 2001
Musical groups from Montreal
Canadian post-rock groups
Constellation Records (Canada) artists